Oolithes is an oogenus with uncertain affinities. It has historical significance because it was the earliest named oogenus. James Buckman described the first named species as Oolithes bathonicae in a communication to the 4 May 1859 meeting of the Geological Society (published in 1860). Buckman believed that Oolithes represented the eggs of a teleosaurian reptile.

Since Buckman's description of O. bathonicae, two other oospecies have been named: O. nanhsiungensis and O. spheroides, both of which were native to the Maastrichtian of China.

References 

Egg fossils
Bathonian life
Maastrichtian life
Cretaceous China
Fossils of China
Cretaceous England
Jurassic England
Fossils of England
Fossil parataxa described in 1860